Cola bracteata is a species of flowering plant in the family Malvaceae.
It is found only in Uganda.

References

bracteata
Endemic flora of Uganda
Vulnerable flora of Africa
Taxonomy articles created by Polbot